There are at least 121 named trails in Madison County, Montana according to the U.S. Geological Survey, Board of Geographic Names.  A trail is defined as: "Route for passage from one point to another; does not include roads or highways (jeep trail, path, ski trail)."

 Ambush Meadows Ski Trail, el.  
 Ambush Ski Trail, el.  
 Arch Rock Ski Trail, el.  
 A-Z Chutes Ski Trail, el.  
 Bacon Rind Ski Trail, el.  
 Bad Dog Ski Trail, el.  
 Bavarian Forest Ski Trail, el.  
 Bert Road Ski Trail, el.  
 Big Couloir Ski Trail, el.  
 Big Horn Ski Trail, el.  
 Big Rock Tongue Ski Trail, el.  
 Billy Johns Trail, el.  
 Black and Blue Ski Trail, el.  
 Black Rock Gully Ski Trail, el.  
 Blue Moon Ski Trail, el.  
 Bone Crusher Ski Trail, el.  
 Bozeman Trail Ski Trail, el.  
 Brazil Pack Trail, el.  
 Broken Arrow Ski Trail, el.  
 Buffalo Jump Ski Trail, el.  
 Cache Trees Ski Trail, el.  
 Calamity Jane Ski Trail, el.  
 Chucks Run Ski Trail, el.  
 Country Club Ski Trail, el.  
 Cow Creek Trail, el.  
 Cow Flats Ski Trail, el.  
 Crazy Horse Ski Trail, el.  
 Crazy Raven Ski Trail, el.  
 Crons Pocket Ski Trail, el.  
 Cue Ball Ski Trail, el.  
 Currant Creek Trail, el.  
 Cutoff Trail, el.  
 Dakota Territory Ski Trail, el.  
 Dead Top Ski Trail, el.  
 Deep South Ski Trail, el.  
 Dictator Chutes Ski Trail, el.  
 Dirt Bag Wall Ski Trail, el.  
 Dry Fork Trail, el.  
 Duck Walk Ski Trail, el.  
 Dude Park Ski Trail, el.  
 El Dorado Ski Trail, el.  
 Elk Park Meadows Ski Trail, el.  
 Elk Park Ridge Ski Trail, el.  
 Exit Chute Ski Trail, el.  
 Fast Lane Ski Trail, el.  
 Fifth Gully Ski Trail, el.  
 First Gully Ski Trail, el.  
 Fourth Gully Ski Trail, el.  
 Gazelle Creek Pack Trail, el.  
 Gilbert Trail, el.  
 Gun Mount Ski Trail, el.  
 Hangmans Ski Trail, el.  
 High Clearing Ski Trail, el.  
 Highway Ski Trail, el.  
 Huntley Hollow Ski Trail, el.  
 Hyde Creek Trail, el.  
 Kurts Glades Ski Trail, el.  
 Larkspur Ski Trail, el.  
 Liberty Bowl Ski Trail, el.  
 Lightning Creek Trail, el.  
 Lightning Ski Trail, el.  
 Little Ewe Ski Trail, el.  
 Little Gullies Ski Trail, el.  
 Little Rock Tongue Ski Trail, el.  
 Little Tree Ski Trail, el.  
 Lobo Mesa Pack Trail, el.  
 Lobo Ski Trail, el.  
 Lone Wolf Ski Trail, el.  
 Lost Cabin Lake Recreation Trail, el.  
 Louise Lake National Recreation Trail, el.  
 Low Bench Ski Trail, el.  
 Low Clearing Ski Trail, el.  
 Lower Bone Crusher Ski Trail, el.  
 Lower Calamity Jane Ski Trail, el.  
 Lower Mister K Ski Trail, el.  
 Lower Morningstar Ski Trail, el.  
 Mad Wolf Ski Trail, el.  
 Madison Avenue Ski Trail, el.  
 Marmot Meadows Ski Trail, el.  
 Midnight Basin Ski Trail, el.  
 Mister K Ski Trail, el.  
 Moonlight Basin Ski Trail, el.  
 Nashville Bowl Ski Trail, el.  
 Never Sweat Ski Trail, el.  
 Old Faithful Glades Ski Trail, el.  
 Onslows Ski Trail, el.  
 Pacifer Ski Trail, el.  
 Pack Saddle Ski Trail, el.  
 Peacock Creek Trail, el.  
 Pedro Trail, el.  
 Ponderosa Ski Trail, el.  
 Powder River Ski Trail, el.  
 Quartz Hill Trail, el.  
 Rice Bowl Ski Trail, el.  
 Sacajawea Ski Trail, el.  
 Screaming Left Ski Trail, el.  
 Second Gully Ski Trail, el.  
 Seventeenth Green Ski Trail, el.  
 Short Shot Ski Trail, el.  
 Silverknife Ski Trail, el.  
 Sixth Gully Ski Trail, el.  
 Snake Bite Ski Trail, el.  
 Snake Pit Ski Trail, el.  
 Stump Farm Ski Trail, el.  
 Stutzmans Rock Ski Trail, el.  
 Sunlight Ski Trail, el.  
 The Bowl Ski Trail, el.  
 The Pinnacles Ski Trail, el.  
 The Wave Ski Trail, el.  
 Third Gully Ski Trail, el.  
 Thunder Ski Trail, el.  
 Tippys Tumble Ski Trail, el.  
 Tohelluride Ski Trail, el.  
 Turkey Traverse Ski Trail, el.  
 Upper Morningstar Ski Trail, el.  
 Upper Sunlight Ski Trail, el.  
 Vertical Reality Ski Trail, el.  
 War Dance Ski Trail, el.  
 White Wing Ski Trail, el.  
 Yellow Mule Ski Trail, el.  
 Zucchini Patch Ski Trail, el.

Further reading

See also
 List of trails of Montana
 Trails of Yellowstone National Park

Notes

Geography of Madison County, Montana
 Madison County
Transportation in Madison County, Montana